Susan Truppe (born August 20, 1959) is a Canadian politician, who was elected to the House of Commons of Canada in the 2011 election. She represented the electoral district of London North Centre as a member of the Conservative Party.

Truppe served as parliamentary secretary for Status of Women for the entire 41st Parliament as well as serving on the Standing Committee on the Status of Women and the Special Committee on Violence Against Indigenous Women.

Truppe was defeated in the 2015 Canadian federal election by Liberal Party of Canada candidate Peter Fragiskatos.

On November 4, 2016, Truppe announced that she would seek the Progressive Conservative Party of Ontario nomination in London North Centre. On April 2, 2017 she won the nomination to become the Progressive Conservative Party of Ontario candidate for the 42nd Ontario general election, however she lost the election, finishing second to Terence Kernaghan.

Electoral history

References

External links
Official website

1959 births
Women members of the House of Commons of Canada
Conservative Party of Canada MPs
Living people
Members of the House of Commons of Canada from Ontario
Politicians from London, Ontario
Politicians from Windsor, Ontario
Women in Ontario politics
21st-century Canadian politicians
21st-century Canadian women politicians